Allting som ni gör kan jag göra bättre (which translates as "Everything you can do, I can do better") is the eighth studio album by Swedish pop and rock artist Magnus Uggla. It was released in 1987. The album consists only of cover songs. The title is a reference to both the fact that the entire album is cover songs, "you" being the original artists, and also a call-back to the musical Annie Get Your Gun. Most of the songs are famous recordings from the progg era.

Cover
The back of the album cover features Carl Johan De Geer's painting Skända flaggan from 1967.

Track listing
Side one
 "" (covering Nationalteatern) - 3:28
 "" (covering Ola Magnell) - 3:28
 "Vem kan man lita på?" (covering Hoola Bandoola Band) - 4:08
 "Häng me' på party" (covering ) - 2:56
 "" (covering Tomas Ledin) - 4:10

Side two
 "Hög standard" (covering Peps Blodsband) - 3:27
 "Tjejer (Potpurri)" ("Vi måste höja våra röster") covering , Suzanne Osten och  and "1000 systrar" covering Jösses Flickor) - 2:43
 "" (covering Philemon Arthur and the Dung) - 1:56
 "Speedy Gonzales" (covering Nationalteatern) - 3:22
 "" (covering Pugh Rogefeldt) - 3:02
 "Ska vi gå hem till dig" (covering ) - 5:05

The original LP has a version of "Vem kan man lita på where the lyrics ”och Robert Zimmerman flytt till landet med miljonerna” ("and Robert Zimmerman has fled to the country with the millions") is replaced by ”och Björn Afzelius har flytt till Italien med miljonerna” ("and Björn Afzelius has fled to Italy with the millions"). That version was later censored and later versions has the original text.

Charts

References

External links
 Information at Svensk mediedatabas
 Information at Svensk mediedatabas
 Information at Svensk mediedatabas
 Information at Magnus Uggla's website

1987 albums
Covers albums
Magnus Uggla albums